Penrith may refer to:

Australia
Penrith, New South Wales, a satellite city of Sydney, Australia
Penrith Stadium, home ground of the Penrith Panthers
Penrith Bears, ice-hockey team
City of Penrith, local government area
Electoral district of Penrith, for the Legislative Assembly of New South Wales
Penrith railway station, Sydney

United Kingdom
Penrith, Cumbria, a market town in North West England
Penrith and The Border (UK Parliament constituency), a UK constituency since 1950
Penrith and Cockermouth (UK Parliament constituency), from 1918 to 1950
Penrith (UK Parliament constituency), from 1885 to 1918
Penrith railway station
Penrith Building Society, a financial institution in Cumbria, England
Penrith A.F.C., a football club in Penrith, Cumbria
Penrydd, a former parish in Wales, also spelled Penrith

Elsewhere
Penrith, Washington, a community in the United States